Evolfo is a psychedelic rock band based out of Brooklyn, NY. Evolfo is a 7 piece band. The band has been referred to by critics as a "psych rock septet". In 2017, Evolfo released their debut album Last of the Acid Cowboys. The band's second album: Site Out Of Mind was released on June 18, 2021, on Royal Potato Family Records.

Discography

Studio albums 
 2017 - Last of the Acid Cowboys
 2021 - Site Out of Mind

References

External links 
 Site Out of Mind Album Review June, 2022 by Post-Trash
 Evolfo artist page - Royal Potato Family
Evolfo share El Oms-directed music video 'Give Me Time - CULTURE ADDICTS - May, 2021
Evolfo premiere new single/video "Let Go" - GratefulWeb - June, 2021

Musical groups from Brooklyn
Psychedelic rock music groups from New York (state)
Musical groups established in 2011
2011 establishments in New York City